Unterleinleiter is a municipality in the district of Forchheim in Bavaria in Germany.

References

 
Forchheim (district)